Wheatland Township, Illinois may refer to one of the following townships:

 Wheatland Township, Bureau County, Illinois
 Wheatland Township, Fayette County, Illinois
 Wheatland Township, Will County, Illinois
 there is also: South Wheatland Township, Macon County, Illinois

See also

Wheatland Township (disambiguation)

Illinois township disambiguation pages